

81001–81100 

|-bgcolor=#f2f2f2
| colspan=4 align=center | 
|}

81101–81200 

|-bgcolor=#f2f2f2
| colspan=4 align=center | 
|}

81201–81300 

|-id=203
| 81203 Polynesia ||  || French Polynesia, because it was the first discovery from this region of the world || 
|}

81301–81400 

|-bgcolor=#f2f2f2
| colspan=4 align=center | 
|}

81401–81500 

|-bgcolor=#f2f2f2
| colspan=4 align=center | 
|}

81501–81600 

|-bgcolor=#f2f2f2
| colspan=4 align=center | 
|}

81601–81700 

|-bgcolor=#f2f2f2
| colspan=4 align=center | 
|}

81701–81800 

|-id=790
| 81790 Lewislove ||  || Lewis E. Love (born 1928), American physics teacher at Great Neck North High School || 
|}

81801–81900 

|-id=822
| 81822 Jamesearly ||  || James M. Early (1922–2004), American co-inventor of the transistor || 
|-id=859
| 81859 Joetaylor ||  || Joseph Hooton Taylor Jr. (born 1941), American astronomer, pulsar hunter extraordinaire, Nobel laureate and MacArthur fellow. The naming is on the occasion of his retirement as a professor at Princeton University in September 2006. || 
|}

81901–82000 

|-id=915
| 81915 Hartwick ||  || F. David A. Hartwick  (born 1941), Canadian astrophysicist at the University of Victoria || 
|-id=947
| 81947 Fripp ||  || Robert Fripp (born 1946) is a musician who pushes the boundaries of music using guitars, masterful technique, and recording and sound processing effects. His leadership of King Crimson and work with fellow experimentalist Brian Eno has been an essential innovative driving force in music. || 
|-id=948
| 81948 Eno ||  || Brian Eno (born 1948) is an experimental sculptor of sound who has worked with many musicians in his career, notably as an iconic duo with Robert Fripp (see entry above). Along with Fripp, he is from the research and development branch of music intermingled with Oblique Strategies. || 
|-id=971
| 81971 Turonclavere ||  || Marie-Hélène Turon Clavère (born 1949), French schoolteacher and amateur astronomer || 
|}

References 

081001-082000